The Roman Catholic Church in Honduras comprises only a Latin hierarchy, joined in the Episcopal Conference of Honduras, comprising a single ecclesiastical province (covering all and only Honduras), headed by the Metropolitan archbishop of the capital, with nine suffragan dioceses each headed by a bishop.

There are no Eastern Catholic, pre-diocesan or other exempt jurisdictions.

There are no titular sees. All defunct jurisdictions have current successor sees.

There is an Apostolic Nunciature to Honduras as papal diplomatic representation (embassy-level), in the national capital Tegucigalpa.

Current jurisdictions

Ecclesiastical province of Tegucigalpa 
 Metropolitan Archdiocese of Tegucigalpa
 Roman Catholic Diocese of Choluteca
 Roman Catholic Diocese of Comayagua
 Roman Catholic Diocese of Danlí
 Roman Catholic Diocese of Juticalpa

Ecclesiastical province of San Pedro Sula 
Metropolitan Archdiocese of San Pedro Sula
 Roman Catholic Diocese of La Ceiba
 Roman Catholic Diocese of Gracias
 Roman Catholic Diocese of Santa Rosa de Copán
 Roman Catholic Diocese of Trujillo
 Roman Catholic Diocese of Yoro

See also 
 List of Catholic dioceses (structured view)

References

External links 
 Catholic-Hierarchy entry.

Honduras
Catholic dioceses